Dancing at Budokan!! is a DVD/BD set and live album released by Japanese recording artist Superfly. The performances featured are from Superfly's December 14, 2009, concert at the Nippon Budokan arena in Tokyo, all recorded on the first DVD/BD. The second DVD/BD features footage of Shiho Ochi's performance with Big Brother and the Holding Company at the Bethel Woods Center for the Arts stop on the Heroes of Woodstock Tour, an interview on her album Box Emotions, and the live performances at the Roppongi Hills Arena free concert. The limited edition DVD bundle includes a two CD album of the Budokan concert. On the Oricon music DVD charts, it peaked at #7 while on the charts for 7 weeks.

Track list

iTunes Store EP
Prior to the release of Dancing at Budokan!!, the iTunes Store released an EP of four of the songs off of the DVD. On the DVD's release date, iTunes released another version of the EP that included the songs from the first with four video recordings from the DVD.

References

2010 live albums
Superfly (band) albums
Live albums by Japanese artists
2010 video albums
Live video albums
Albums recorded at the Nippon Budokan